Arispe may refer to:

 Arispe (moth), a snout moth genus in subfamily Pyralinae
 Arispe, Iowa, United States
 Arispe, Texas, United States
 Arispe, Sonora, Mexico — see Arizpe
 Pedro Arispe (1900–1960), Uruguayan footballer